The Women's football tournament of the 2019 South Asian Games will be the 3rd edition of the tournament. It will be played at Pokhara Rangasala in Pokhara, Nepal, from 3 December to 10 December 2019.

India are defending champions.

Venue

Participating nations

Squads

Fixtures and Results
All times are local, NPT (UTC+05:45).

Round Robin stage
It is being played on round-robin format. The top two teams will be play in the final. The team finishing third in the Group Stage will be awarded with bronze medal.

Gold medal match

Goalscorers

Final Results

References

External links

2019 South Asian Games
2019 South Asian Games
South Asian Games